
Gmina Jedlnia-Letnisko is a rural gmina (administrative district) in Radom County, Masovian Voivodeship, in east-central Poland.

Villages
Gmina Jedlnia-Letnisko contains the villages and settlements of Aleksandrów, Antoniówka, Cudnów, Dawidów, Groszowice, Gzowice, Gzowice-Folwark, Gzowice-Kolonia, Jedlnia-Letnisko, Lasowice, Maryno, Myśliszewice, Natolin, Piotrowice, Rajec Poduchowny, Rajec Szlachecki, Sadków, Sadków-Górki, Siczki, Słupica and Wrzosów.

Neighbouring gminas
Gmina Jedlnia-Letnisko is bordered by the towns of Pionki and Radom, and by the gminas of Gózd, Jastrzębia and Pionki.

References
Polish official population figures 2006

Jedlnia-Letnisko
Gmina Jedlnia Letnisko